Khwezi Sifunda, better known as Khwezi (born in Pietermartizburg, South Africa) is a South African computer programmer, internet entrepreneur, music producer and businessman.

History 

Khwezi is the founder and CEO of WeAreAfriKa. He gained popularity by being named as a feature artist on 5FM, South Africa's most popular radio station, as an artist on Rocking The Republic, a feature show on the radio station. Khwezi has worked with or written for notable artists/producers such as Rye Rye, Dej Loaf, DJ Chuckie, Makeba Riddick and Chris Brown.

On 1 June 2016 Khwezi founded "MBK" a London based company and presently serves as the CEO.

Musical career 

On 11 June 2014 he signed with Sony Music Entertainment's RCA Records. He released his debut single "Top of the World" on 17 April 2015. He got his first career number 1 record on May 24, 2015 when "Top of the World" reached the top spot on the OFM local music charts.

On 7 August 2015 he released the Babylon EP as a digital download on Sony Music.

Khwezi's track 'Feeling High', released on the independent American record label 'Bonfire Records' has gained over 2.1 million streams on streaming service Spotify.

Awards and nominations

OFM Awards

|-
|2015
| rowspan="2"|Khwezi
| rowspan="2"|Song of the Year
|
|-

Metro FM Music Awards.

The Metro FM Music Awards are held annually by the South African Radio Station Metro FM. 

|-
|2014
| rowspan="2"|Danny K
| rowspan="2"|Best RnB Album
|
|-

South African Music Awards

The South African Music Awards (SAMAs) are an annual award ceremony, run by the Recording Industry of South Africa (RiSA), where accolades are presented to members of South Africa's music industry.

|-
|2015
| rowspan="2"|Toya Delazy
| rowspan="2"|Best Pop Album
|
|-

Discography

References

External links 
https://soundcloud.com/khweziofficial
http://www.beatport.com/artist/probsnmayhem
https://archive.today/20130421203156/http://www.5fm.co.za/djs/Catherine/blog/rocking-the-republic-probsnmayhem/send-share

Living people
South African DJs
1993 births
South African record producers
South African musicians
Electronic dance music DJs